The 2008 Harrogate Council election took place on 1 May 2008 to elect members of Harrogate Borough Council in North Yorkshire, England. One third of the council was up for election and the council stayed under no overall control.

After the election, the composition of the council was
Conservative 27
Liberal Democrat 21
Independent 6

Campaign
Before the election the Conservatives held 24 of the 54 seats, the Liberal Democrats 23 and independents 6. A further seat in Lower Nidderdale was vacant after the death of Conservative councillor Elwyn Hinchcliffe.

16 seats were contested in the election, all from the rural areas of the council, with the Conservatives the party defending in 13 seats and the Liberal Democrats in 3. 2 incumbent councillors stood down at the election, Nick Wilson from Newby ward and Chris Lewis from Ouseburn ward. The Conservatives contested all 16 seats, the Liberal Democrats 15, British National Party 6, Labour 5, United Kingdom Independence Party 3 and 1 independent.

Issues in the election included a possible recycling plant near Boroughbridge and the storage site for toxic chemicals in Melmerby, as well as the issues of transport, affordable housing and the council tax.

Election result
The results saw the Conservatives gain 2 seats from the Liberal Democrats to hold 27 seats, exactly half of the council. The Conservatives gained Boroughbridge and Ouseburn wards, by 161 and 731 votes respectively, to reduce the Liberal Democrats to 21 seats. The only seat held by the Liberal Democrats was in Pateley Bridge by 77 votes, but they came 34 votes short of taking Lower Nidderdale and 37 votes from taking Claro. No other party won any seats in the election, while 6 independent councillors remained on the council, after none of them had been defending seats in the election. Overall turnout in the election was 48%, the highest in a decade apart from the all postal voting election in 2004.

Ward results

References

2008
2008 English local elections
2000s in North Yorkshire